Khilchipur State was a 9 gun salute princely state in India. The seat was in Khilchipur. Its estimated revenue in 1901 was Rs.1,14,000.

History
Founded in 1544 by Dewan Ugra Sen, who was forced by family dissensions to migrate from the Khichi capital of Gagraun. A grant of land was subsequently made to him by the Mughal Emperor, which included the adjoining Zirapur and Machalpur parganas, later conquered by Indore State, and Shujalpur, later in Gwalior State. 
Khilchipur State became a prey to the attack of the Maharaja Scindia of Gwalior, in A.D. 1770 when Abhai Singh, the Ruler of Khilchipur was obliged to make terms with Mahadaji Sindhia and became his tributary.

Khilchipur was formerly the capital of this princely state, under the Bhopal Agency of British India's Central India Agency. The rulers acceded to the Government of India after India's independence in 1947, and the Khilchipur became part of the new state of Madhya Bharat. Madhya Bharat was merged into Madhya Pradesh on 1 November 1956.

Rulers
The rulers of Khilchipur were titled "Rao Bahadur" from  1870 until 1928.

Dewan title 
1679 – 1715                Anup Singh II
1718 – 1738                Fateh Singh
1738 – 1770                .... 
1770 – 1787                Abhai Singh 
1787 – 1795?               Dip Singh 
1795 – 1819                Durjan Sal                         (d. 1819)
1819        Balwant Singh 
1819 – 1868                Shir Singh                         (b. 1814 – d. 1868) 
27 Nov 1868 – Apr 1873     Amar Singh                         (b. 1834 – d. ....)

Rao Bahadur title 
Apr 1873 – 1899            Amar Singh                         (s.a.) 
1899 – 18 Jan 1908         Bhawani Singh 
19 Jan 1908 – 1928         Durjan Sal Singh                   (b. 1897 – d. 1942)

Raja title
1928 – 1942                Durjan Sal Singh                   (s.a.) 
1942 – 15 Aug 1947         Yashodar Singh                     (b. 1918 – d. 1961)
Priyavratsingh khichi

See also
Bhopal Agency
Political integration of India

References

Rajgarh district
Princely states of Madhya Pradesh
1544 establishments in India
1948 disestablishments in India